"Tvoi glaza" is a song recorded by Ukrainian singer Loboda, released as a standalone single on 6 September 2016 by Sony Music. It was later included on Loboda's third studio album H2LO (2017). The song was written by Igor Maysky, Loboda, Rita Dakota, and produced by Natella Krapivina.

Music video 
The music video for the song was shot in Andalusia. According to the producer of the artist and director of the video Natella Krapivina, they initially wanted to shoot in Portugal, but when they found out that the music video maker Alan Badoev was flying there to shoot a video for Max Barskih, they stopped on  Andalusia.

The main idea of the video is that a man and a woman often find themselves in situations where they think that they are from different planets. The video is dedicated to people who met, fell in love, but could not understand each other.

This is the most viewed video clip of the singer with more than 160 million views.

Commercial performance 
The song was a commercial success. For 5 weeks "Tvoi glaza" held the lead in the iTunes chart of the CIS countries. According to InterMedia, the song became the sixth best-selling in the Russian iTunes for 2017. The song also became the most listened to on Yandex.Music service in 2017.

It topped the airplay charts of Russia, as well as the CIS. The single was certified platinum in Russia with total sales of over 200,000 copies.

Awards and nominations 
The song was nominated for several awards as Song of the year, including the Muz-TV Music Awards, RU.TV Music Awards and Realnaya premiya MusicBox. It received a Golden Gramophone Award and was recognized as the most rotated song in Russia at the awards TopHit Music Awards 2018.

Track listing

Charts

Weekly charts

Monthly charts

Year-end charts

Certifications

Version with Max Barskih 

In 2017 at the Muz-TV Music Awards, Svetlana Loboda and Max Barskih performed together a mashup of their hits "Tvoi glaza" and "Tumany". At the request of fans, a studio version of the song was released on 23 June 2017. It reached the first place in iTunes charts of Russia and Ukraine.

Track listing

Charts

References

2016 singles
2016 songs
Russian-language songs
Sony Music singles
Svetlana Loboda songs
Music videos shot in Spain
Number-one singles in Russia
Number-one singles in the Commonwealth of Independent States